Jeanette Jenkins is an American fitness trainer and author of The Hollywood Trainer Weight-Loss Plan - 21 Days to Make Healthy Living a Lifetime Habit book and of various training programs on fitness exercises and healthy eating. She is the founder of The Hollywood Trainer company, also providing fitness programs and personal coaching for athletes, artists and entertainers. Jeanette has appeared in training videos on social media, including YouTube, TikTok, Instagram and Facebook.

Background 
Jeanette Jenkins was born in Hollywood, California, and grew up in Oshawa, Ontario, Canada.  In 1997, Jeanette graduated with the Bachelor of Science degree with specialization in Human Kinetics from the University of Ottawa. While at the university, she began her career as a trainer with the men's football team, helping to prevent and treat sports injuries.  Jenkins has 18 international certifications covering nutrition and various methods of training from weight training and kickboxing to pilates, yoga, metabolic testing, and more. She currently lives and works in Los Angeles, California.

Career
Upon completion her studies at the University of Ottawa in 1997, Jeanette moved to Los Angeles and began teaching fitness classes. Jeanette then founded her own fitness training company, The Hollywood Trainer LLC.

In 2001, she appeared on Season 1, Episode 3 of Fear Factor (Jet Ski to Helicopter/Eat Beetles/Rope Crawl). The episode aired on 06/25/2001.

Since then, Jenkins has been a personal training coach for many artists, including Pink, Kelly Rowland, Alicia Keys and Tracee Ellis Ross, among others.

She also had collaborations with Jurnee Smollett and Nia Long, and was enlisted as trainer by Olympic Gold Medalist Shawn Johnson. Jenkins bases her technique on measurements of body fat percentage, using two methods: bioelectrical impedance and with calipers. The Hollywood Trainer Club's programs include the 30-Day Butt Challenge and 10-Day Ab Blast Challenge and the Bikini Bootcamp.

Since 2007, Jeanette has published a book and created a series of fitness instruction videos, which have been translated into twelve different languages. She also launched “thehollywoodtrainerclub.com,” an online club, discussing fitness and healthy life style;

Jenkins frequently has appeared as a fitness expert on topics such as fitness, nutrition and workout regimens in television programs "Good Morning America," and in outlets like ABC News, and People Magazine, as well as in her alma mater, the University of Ottawa. An advocate of contemporary fitness movement, called the Mindfulness Era, Jeanette is arguably considered among the first trainers in the fitness industry who encouraged people of color to be more involved as health and wellness practitioners,  Jeanette is also known for starting fitness contests in social media platforms TikTok and YouTube, as well as Instagram and Meta. In 2020, her "600 calories in 60 minutes Challenge," a cardio-sculpting kickboxing workout posted on TikTok, became a viral hit, with over 15 million views.

Jeanette was part of the Nike Fitness as a Nike Training Club Ambassador and as a Nike Elite Athlete expert. She was also signed by Apple as a special guest fitness instructor for Fitness+. Aside from this, Jenkins co-created Apple's Health and Fitness Walk Program with Jay Blahnik.

As a volunteer UNICEF Kid Power coach, Jeanette collaborated with  Pink, to motivate kids in the US to stay fit while raising donations for malnourished children around the world. She ran the 2016 NYC Marathon, her first marathon, in support of Keep a Child Alive, an organization co-founded by Alicia Keys. Since 2010, Jeanette has been an advocate of the "Samburu Project," donating a well in her family's name.

Publications 
The Hollywood Trainer Weight-Loss Plan - 21 Days to Make Healthy Living a Lifetime Habit, (2007) by Putnam Adult. (Re-printed by Perigee Trade in 2009)

List of workout videos

References

University of Ottawa alumni
Living people
American exercise instructors
Year of birth missing (living people)